Couples for Christ Foundation may refer to:

Couples for Christ Global Mission Foundation, Inc.
Couples for Christ Foundation for Family and Life